The 2023 United Nations Security Council election will be held in mid-2023 during the 77th session of the United Nations General Assembly, held at United Nations Headquarters in New York City. The elections are for five non-permanent seats on the UN Security Council for two-year mandates commencing on 1 January 2024.
In accordance with the Security Council's rotation rules, whereby the ten non-permanent UNSC seats rotate among the various regional blocs into which UN member states traditionally divide themselves for voting and representation purposes, the five available seats are allocated as follows:

Two for Africa 
One for the Asia-Pacific Group 
One for Latin America and the Caribbean
One for the Eastern European Group

The five members will serve on the Security Council for the 2024–25 period.

Candidates

Africa Group 
Candidates for 2 available positions are:

Asia-Pacific Group
Candidates for 1 available position are:

Eastern European Group 
Candidates for 1 available position are:
 
 
P5 Endorsements:

Latin American and Caribbean Group 
Candidate for 1 available position is:

See also
List of members of the United Nations Security Council

References

2023 elections
2023
Non-partisan elections